"Två av oss" is a song written by Efva Attling, which was recorded by X-models and released as a single in 1981. It was a Svensktoppen hit for ten weeks between 29 November 1981 – 7 March 1982, peaking at number four.

The X-models' single is one of the titles in the 2009 book Tusen svenska klassiker.

Charts

References

1981 songs
1981 singles
Number-one singles in Sweden
Swedish songs
Swedish-language songs
Parlophone singles